The Operation Group of the Foreign Legion was a unit of the Foreign Legion with an operational vocation.

Created on August 1, 1971 from elements of the 1st Foreign Regiment, themselves regrouped at the corps of the Foreign Legion Groupment (G.L.E), which included the attachment of the Instruction Group of the Foreign Legion at the 2nd Foreign Regiment 2e RE, recreated on September 1, 1972.

In 1976, while the Instruction Group of the Foreign Legion departed to the 4th Foreign Regiment 4eRE of Castelnaudary and while being integrated within the 1st Foreign Regiment 1er RE; the 2nd Foreign Regiment 2e RE took charge of regimental operations.

The operational group was stationed in Bonifacio, Corsica until 1977, the year of dissolution of the (G.O.L.E) to become a main composing elements of the 2nd Foreign Regiment 2e RE, designated originally back in 1980: the 2nd Foreign Infantry Regiment 2e REI.

History of the garrisons, campaigns and battles

The G.O.L.E was engaged from 1978 to 1979 in Tchad, where the 7th company endured two 2 killed and 5 wounded in combat.

The G.O.L.E was engaged in 1976 in the French Territory of the Afars and the Issas in a counter-terrorist children rescue mission in 1976 in the LOYADA affair where the 6th company deplored 6 killed in a helicopter crash.

Organization 

At creation, the G.O.L.E regrouped 3 combat companies, reinforced in operations by the 4th squadron of the 1st Foreign Cavalry Regiment 1e REC. Initially, the G.O.L.E consisted of the 5th, 6th combat company as well a support combat company. However, the 5th and 6th combat companies didn't exist in 1971, the 5th was the C.M.L.E and the 6th combat company was the 3rd combat company commanded by Captain Braun. The G.O.L.E was created in 1971 and commanded by colonel Letestu. Later in 1975, the 7th combat company of the G.O.L.E would be created in Comoros, Mayotte and would rejoin Bonifacio.

Chef de Corps 
 Général d'armées Michel Guignon

See also 

Major (France)
2nd Foreign Parachute Regiment
31st Brigade

References

External links 
 GOLE 1971-1977 - History & images of the GOLE

Units of the French Foreign Legion
Military units and formations established in 1971
Military units and formations disestablished in 1977